Teresa of Portugal may refer to:

 Theresa, Countess of Portugal (1080–1130), mother of Afonso Henriques, the first King of Portugal
 Theresa of Portugal, Countess of Flanders (1157–1218), daughter of Afonso Henriques and wife of Philip, Count of Flanders
 Theresa of Portugal, Queen of León (1181–1250), daughter of Sancho I of Portugal and wife of Alfonso IX of León
 Infanta Maria Teresa of Braganza (1793-1874), firstborn child of John VI of Portugal

ca:Teresa